The speaker of the House of Representatives is the presiding officer of the Federal House of Representatives of Nigeria, elected by its membership. The House Speaker is third in line of succession to the Nigerian Presidency, after the Vice President of Nigeria and the President of the Senate of Nigeria. The current House Speaker is Femi Gbajabiamila who was elected Speaker of House of Representatives of Nigeria on 12 June 2019.

History
Sir Frederic Metcalfe of Great Britain became the first Speaker of the House of Representatives of Nigeria after its inauguration on 12 January 1955 by John Macpherson. He was replaced by the first indigenous speaker, Jaja Wachuku, in 1959. As Speaker of the House, Wachuku received Nigeria's Instrument of Independence, also known as Freedom Charter, on 1 October 1960, from Princess Alexandra of Kent (Alexandra was Elizabeth II's representative at the Nigerian Independence ceremonies). Chaha Biam hails from Ukum Local Government Area of Benue State. He was elected to the House of Representative on the platform of NPN in the 1983 general elections and was elected as the Speaker of House of Representative in the short-lived second tenure of Alhaji Shehu Shagari, 1 October 1983 – 31 December 1983. Dimeji Bankole is the youngest Speaker in the history of the House of Representatives, elected at the age of 37.

Selection and succession to presidency
The speaker is chosen in an indirect election conducted within the House of Representatives. The line of succession to the Nigerian presidency goes to the Vice President, and then the President of the Senate should both the President and Vice President be unable to discharge the powers and duties of office. The Speaker of the House is the third in line of succession.

List of speakers

References

Official website of the House of Representatives
Assemblyonline, news agency on Nigeria's National Assembly

Nigeria
 Chaha Biam speaker 1983
Speakers